PetroVietnam Joinstock Finance Corporation (international transaction name: PetroVietnam Finance Corporation, brief name PVFC) is a non-banking finance corporation, a subsidiary of Vietnam National Oil and Gas Group PetroVietnam.

The corporation's slogan is "New Confidence of Development".

History
PVFC  was founded on June 19, 2000 under the name PetroVietnam Finance Company. It was certificated ISO 9001:2000 by SGS (Switzerland) on May 5, 2004. In 2008, it transformed to Petrovietnam Finance Joint Stock Corporation with VND 5000 billion chartered capital. It held IPO in October 2008 and listed on the Ho Chi Minh Securities Trading Center under code PVF. Strategic partner Morgan Stanley holds 10% out of PVFC's chartered capital.

Products
Investment
Projects Investment
Valuable Notes Investment
Merged and Acquisitions
Trust Investment
Corporate Finance
Credit Finance
Corporate Fund Arrangement Services
Financial Advisory Services
Money Services and Forex
Personal Finance
Saving and Deposit
Personal Credit
Forward Trading
Personal Trust Investment

Subsidiaries
Head office
Joint stock companies
PVFC Real Estate Joinstock Company (PVFCLand)
PVFC Investment & Consultancy Company (PVFC Invest)
PVFC Fund Management Joinstock Company (PVFC Capital)
PVFI
Phu Dat
9 branches
15 transaction offices

External links
Website of PVFC

Companies listed on the Ho Chi Minh City Stock Exchange
Oil and gas companies of Vietnam
Companies based in Hanoi
2000 establishments in Vietnam